J Ariadhitya Pramuhendra (born in 1984 in Indonesia), is an Indonesian artist who includes self-portraits in his works. He is famous for his realistic black and white charcoal paintings.

External links
 J. Ariadhitya Pramuhendra Website
 Galrie Perrotin Hong Kong Exhibition - Religion of Science

1984 births
21st-century Indonesian painters
Living people
Date of birth missing (living people)